Dario Floreano (born 1964 in San Daniele del Friuli, Italy) is a Swiss-Italian roboticist and engineer. He is director of the Laboratory of Intelligent System (LIS) at the École Polytechnique Fédérale de Lausanne in Switzerland as well as the Swiss National Centre of Competence in Research (NCCR) Robotics.

Education and career
Floreano received a Bachelor's degree at University of Trieste with a major in visual psychophysics in 1988. In 1989, he joined the Italian National Research Council in Rome as research fellow. He received a Master's degree computer sciences with a specialisation in neural computation from the University of Stirling in 1992. In 1995, he earned a PhD in artificial intelligence and robotics from the University of Trieste. Following a position as chief scientific officer at Cognitive Technology Laboratory Ltd, he joined the EPFL in 1996 as group leader in the Department of Computer Science. In 2000, Floreano was first named Assistant Professor, then in 2005 Associate Professor and in 2010 Full Professor of Intelligent Systems at EPFL's School of Engineering. He has been the founding director of the Swiss National Center of Competence in Robotics between 2010 and 2022.

Research
Floreano is interested in biologically inspired artificial intelligence and robots. He made pioneering contributions to Evolutionary Robotics, a research field where robots equipped with artificial neural networks are evolved using artificial evolution; to Autonomous Drones with a series of innovative machines loosely inspired from insects and birds, and to Soft Robotics with the development of multi-functional materials for wearable robots, flying robots, and modular robots. He published hundreds of peer-reviewed articles and four books on neural networks, evolutionary robotics, bio-inspired artificial intelligence, and bio-inspired flying robots.

Floreano co-organized several international conferences in the fields of bio-mimetic engineering and is or has been on the editorial board of several international journals: Neural Networks; Genetic Programming and Evolvable Machines; Adaptive Behavior; Artificial Life; Connection Science; Evolutionary Computation; IEEE Transactions on Evolutionary Computation; Autonomous Robots; Evolutionary Intelligence.

He was co-founder and member of the Board of Directors of the International Society for Artificial Life, Inc., member of the Board of Governors of the International Society for Neural Networks, Advisory Board member of the Future and Emerging Technology division of the European Commission, and founding members and vice-chair of the General Agenda Council on Robotics of the World Economic Forum.

He was also director of a podcast series which featured interviews with professionals in robotics and artificial intelligence for an inside view on the science, technology, and business of intelligent robotics. His former PhD students and postdocs continued and expanded the podcast.

In addition to academic research and teaching, Dario Floreano has spun off two drone companies, senseFly (2009) and Flyability (2014), which continue to set new standards in user-friendly professional drones for inspection, agriculture, and survey. He also lectures at international conferences, governmental meetings, and company events. He is particularly interested in exploring the co-evolution of intelligent robots and humans.

Selected works

References

External links
 
 Website of the Laboratory of Intelligent Systems

Italian roboticists
Alumni of the University of Stirling
Living people
Academic staff of the École Polytechnique Fédérale de Lausanne
1964 births
Researchers of artificial life